Ted Pecchio is an American bassist and currently a member of Doyle Bramhall II’s touring group. Prior to that he played with Colonel Bruce Hampton and the Codetalkers and Susan Tedeschi.  Pecchio was born in Youngstown, Ohio and is the son of Daniel Pecchio, bassist for the bands Glass Harp and The Michael Stanley Band.

Discography
Now, The Codetalkers (Collard Green, 2006) 
51 - OTT, Migraine (2007)
52 - Grasshopper, Migraine (2008)
Sidewalk Caesars, Scrapomatic (Landslide, 2008)
142 - Ivan II - Static, Migraine (2008)
Back to the River, Susan Tedeschi (Verve, 2008)
81a - Cracked, Migraine (2008)
Already Free, The Derek Trucks Band (RCA Victor, 2009)
92 - Beep!, Migraine (2009)
Never Going Back, Shemekia Copeland (Telarc, 2009)
112 - Echoes of Bats and Men, Migraine (2009)
131 - Gas Mask, Migraine (2009)

References

Living people
Year of birth missing (living people)